Dongxi may refer to:

Dongxi, Cili, Hunan
Dongxi, Shigatse, Tibet

See also
Dongxiang (disambiguation)